Elections were held in Delaware on Tuesday, November 2, 2010. Primary elections were held on September 14, 2010.

Federal

Senate 

The 2010 election for the United States Senate was an open seat special election to finish the term ending in January 2015. Joe Biden, the 36-year Senator from the seat, was reelected to his Senate seat in 2008 and was simultaneously elected Vice President of the United States. He resigned on January 16, 2009 in order to take his seat as Vice President (he was sworn in five days later, on January 20, Inauguration Day). Delaware Governor Ruth Ann Minner announced her intention to appoint Biden's longtime aide and chief of staff Edward E. "Ted" Kaufman on November 24, 2008, and made the appointment the same day Biden resigned. Kaufman was sworn in as a Senator the next day. He made clear that he would not be a candidate for election in 2010.

Biden's son Beau Biden, the state Attorney General, considered entering the race but decided not to. Democrat Chris Coons, the county executive of New Castle County, entered the race instead and won the Democratic nomination unopposed. In a widely publicized Republican primary, Michael Castle, the former governor and nine-term U.S. Representative for Delaware's sole congressional seat who was initially heavily favored to win the primary and then the general election, was defeated in an upset by Tea Party movement-aligned marketing consultant Christine O'Donnell. Coons went on to defeat O'Donnell, as well as minor-party candidates Glenn A. Miller (Independent Party of Delaware) and James W. Rash (Libertarian), by a wide margin.

House of Representatives 

John Carney was elected to Delaware's sole seat in the House of Representatives, replacing Republican Mike Castle, who vacated his seat to unsuccessfully run for the Senate. This was one of just three House seats to be picked up by the Democrats; the others were Cedric Richmond in Louisiana's 2nd congressional district and Colleen Hanabusa in Hawaii's 1st congressional district.

State

Constitutional officers

Attorney General
Joseph Robinette "Beau" Biden III, son of Vice President Joseph Robinette "Joe" Biden, Jr., cruised to reelection as Delaware Attorney General with no major-party opposition and a commanding 58-point margin of victory. Beau Biden had considered running in the special Senate election held simultaneously with the general election to serve the balance of his father's unexpired Senate term. (His father resigned to become vice president). However, Beau chose to run for reelection as attorney general instead.

Treasurer
In this race, Democrat Chipman "Chip" Flowers Jr., a 35-year-old attorney from Middletown, narrowly edging out Republican Colin R. J. Bonini of Magnolia, a 45-year-old state Senator representing District 16. Flowers will replace Velda Jones-Potter, the incumbent Treasurer appointed by Governor Jack Markell to finish out his term as treasurer when he was elected to the governorship in the 2008 election. Jones-Potter ran for the Democratic nomination, but was defeated by Flowers in the primary. Flowers will become Delaware's first African American elected to statewide office. Bonini remains a state Senator until 2010.

Auditor of Accounts
In this race, longtime State Auditor R. Thomas "Tom" Wagner Jr. of Dover, the Republican nominee and 21-year incumbent, won a sixth term in office by just 2,563 votes (0.8 percent) over Democratic nominee Richard Korn of Wilmington, the president and CEO of Franklin Strategies, a political consulting firm. This was the closest statewide race in Delaware in the 2010 general elections.

General Assembly

Senate
Half of the seats of the Delaware Senate are up for election in 2010.

In District 1, longtime incumbent Senator Harris B. McDowell III of North Wilmington, son of former Congressman Harris B. McDowell, Jr., won unopposed. McDowell, first elected in 1976, is the longest-serving senator.

In District 5, incumbent Senator Catherine (Cathy) Cloutier of Heatherbrooke, a Republican who also had the Working Families ballot line, won reelection to the Brandywine Hundred Senate seat she has held since 2000, defeating Democratic nominee Christopher (Chris) Counihan, a first-time candidate and university professor.

In District 7, incumbent Democrat Patricia M. Blevins, who has served in the Senate since 1990, defeated Republican businessman Fredrick R. Cullis, 61-39 percent.

	
In District 8, Democrat David P. (Dave) Sokola, who had been in the Senate since 1990, defeated Republican first-time candidate A. Louis Saindon, 60.6-39.4 percent.

In District 14, incumbent Democratic Senator Bruce C. Ennis of Smyrna, a legislator since 1982, first in the House and since 2006 in the Senate, easily defeated Republican challenger John A. Moritz.
	

In District 15, longtime Democratic Senator Nancy W. Cook, 74, first elected in 1974 after the death of her husband Allen J. Cook, who had held the seat for 16 years, lost to Republican first-time candidate David G. Lawson of Marydel, 63, a former state trooper and gun-shop owner. Cook was the only General Assembly incumbent running for reelection to be defeated and the only Democrat-to-Republican flip (Democrats picked up two state House seats). The race was especially significant because Cook was the longtime co-chair of the budget-drafting Joint Finance Committee. District 15 covers a sprawling area including almost all of western Kent County, from Smyrna to the outskirts of Harrington.

District 19 was uncontested in the general election. Incumbent Republican Joseph W. (Joe) Booth of Georgetown won his first full term in office. Booth, a dry cleaning-store owner and former Georgetown mayor, Indian River school board member, and seven-year state House Representative, won a special election to replace longtime Senator Thurman Adams, a conservative Democrat, who died in office. Booth beat back a Republican primary challenge from Tea Party and 9-12 activist Eric R. Bodenweiser.

District 20 was uncontested. Democrat George H. Bunting Jr. of Bethany Beach won another term.

House of Representatives

All of the seats in the Delaware House of Representatives are up for election in 2010.

Local

Sheriffs
The countywide position of sheriff was up for election in all of Delaware's three counties.

In heavily Democratic New Castle County, Democratic nominee Trinidad Navarro, 40, a senior corporal and chief media spokesman with the New Castle County Police, won with a very wide margin, defeating Republican William Hart, a commercial construction project manager and Independence Party of Delaware candidate Joseph O'Leary. In the Democratic primaries, Navarro routed 30-year incumbent Sheriff Mike Walsh, 72, with 63.3 percent of the vote. In the Republican primary, Hart defeated O'Leary, 14,377 to 11,105, but O'Leary chose to run as an Independence Party candidate.

 

In Sussex County, Republican Jeffrey Scott Christopher, 46, of Greenwood, a former Sussex County sheriff's chief deputy, won with 53.8 percent of the vote, defeating incumbent Democrat Eric D. Swanson, 56, of Lewes, who had been sheriff since 2007 and prior to that a Delaware State Policeman.

In Kent County, Democrat Norman Wood of Camden, a Smyrna Police Department lieutenant, defeated Republican incumbent Sheriff James A. Higdon Jr. of Dover. Higdon pleaded guilty in July 2010 to driving under the influence on May 29, 2010. First elected in 1994, he won reelection three more times, in 1998, 2002, and 2006, and only in 1998 had an opponent.

References

External links
Delaware State Election Commissioner
U.S. Congress Candidates for Delaware at Project Vote Smart
Delaware Candidate List at Imagine Election - Search for candidates by address or zip code
Delaware Election Guide from Congress.org
Delaware Polls at Pollster.com
Delaware Congressional Races in 2010 campaign finance data for federal races from OpenSecrets
Delaware 2010 campaign finance data for state-level races from Follow the Money
Election 2010 at The News Journal

 
Delaware